Luckner Lazard or Lucner Lazard (July 7, 1928 – May 15, 1998) was a Haitian-born painter and sculptor. Born in Port-au-Prince, Lazard studied for five years at the Centre d'Art before receiving a scholarship in 1951 to study in Paris, France. In 1956, he founded the Brochette Gallery in Haiti and settled in the United States. Lazard's works have been exhibited in Europe, the Caribbean, North America, and Brazil. Some of the galleries he has exhibited at are the French Institute in Mexico, the Zegri Gallery in New York City, and, in 1976, the Paul Robeson Multimedia Center in Washington, D.C.

References

Footnotes

1928 births
1998 deaths
Haitian sculptors
20th-century sculptors
20th-century Haitian painters
20th-century male artists
Haitian male painters
Haitian expatriates in France
Haitian emigrants to the United States